Paweł Baranowski (born 11 October 1990) is a Polish professional footballer who plays as a defender for Polish club Ruch Chorzów.

External links
  
 

1990 births
Living people
People from Suwałki
Polish footballers
Poland youth international footballers
Association football defenders
Ekstraklasa players
I liga players
II liga players
3. Liga players
Kazakhstan Premier League players
Wigry Suwałki players
Podbeskidzie Bielsko-Biała players
OKS Stomil Olsztyn players
GKS Bełchatów players
FC Erzgebirge Aue players
Odra Opole players
Górnik Łęczna players
FC Atyrau players
Ruch Chorzów players
Polish expatriate footballers
Expatriate footballers in Germany
Polish expatriate sportspeople in Germany
Expatriate footballers in Kazakhstan
Polish expatriate sportspeople in Kazakhstan